Parliamentary elections were held in Madagascar on 8 August 1965. The result was a victory for the Social Democratic Party, which won 104 of the 107 seats (reduced from 127) in the National Assembly.

Results

References

Elections in Madagascar
Madagascar
1965 in Madagascar
August 1965 events in Africa
Election and referendum articles with incomplete results